Lake Bolsena is a lake of volcanic origin in the northern part of the  province of Viterbo  called Alto Lazio ("Upper Latium") or Tuscia in central Italy. It is the largest volcanic lake in Europe. Roman historic records indicate activity of the Vulsini volcano occurred as recently as 104 BC; it has been dormant since then. The two islands in the southern part of the lake were formed by underwater eruptions following the collapse that created the depression.

The lake is supplied entirely from the aquifer, rainfall and runoff, with one outlet at the southern end. A sewage treatment plant filters most of the raw sewage from the surrounding communities. Constructed in 1996, it features pipelines transporting the sewage from every major community around the lake to the treatment plant on the Marta River; that is, no effluents enter the lake. Fertilizers are a second source of contamination. However, the chemical content of the lake is monitored at several stations around it.

The lake has a long historic tradition. The Romans called it Lacus Volsinii, adapting the Etruscan name, Velzna, of the last Etruscan city to hold out against Rome, which was translocated after 264 BC, and its original location today has not been securely identified. The lake is bordered on one side by a modernized version of the Roman consular road Via Cassia. In addition to the historic sites of all periods, Lake Bolsena is currently surrounded by numerous tourist establishments, largely for camping, agrotourism and bed and breakfasts.

One third of the lake was donated to the Catholic church by the noble family Alberici of Orvieto. In recognition of the donation the Alberici family was honored with a ceremony three times a year performed by the Bishop of Orvieto.

Geography

The lake has an oval shape typical of crater lakes. The long axis of the ellipse is aligned in a north-south direction. The bottom is roughly conical reaching a maximum depth at a point in the middle. The entire lake is surrounded by hills on the flanks and summits of which are the comuni. The watershed was home to 22,000 permanent residents in 2004, and 35,000 in the summer season.

On the northern rim of the caldera is San Lorenzo Nuovo ("New Saint Lawrence"), which was moved from an older site (a hypothetical San Lorenzo Vecchio, "Old Saint Lawrence") further down the slope to avoid malaria. The northern shore of the lake once featured marshes, breeding grounds for the mosquitos that carry the disease. Currently it is agricultural. At the site of old San Lorenzo are Etruscan antiquities. To the north of San Lorenzo Nuovo and the caldera rim is Acquapendente.

Bolsena extends upward on the northeast shore, with Orvieto  further to the northeast, at the edge of the volcanic region. To the south of the lake is Marta, on the right bank of the Marta River, sole effluent of the lake. The shore there is straight and developed. Elevations are within  of the lake. Next to Marta are Valentano and Capodimonte, the latter being built on and around nearly the only headland on the lake, which forms a protective harbor. About  to the south are Tuscania and Viterbo, the latter being the regional capital.

From Valentano north is the Latera caldera, a shallow crater perhaps half the size of Lake Bolsena, with Lake Mezzano (usually too small for the map) at the western end. On its north rim is Latera. The floor of the caldera is mainly agricultural although the uncultivable rocky lava flows have been left forested. Although the hills on the west side of Lake Bolsena are only slightly higher than those on the south, the terrain is somewhat too rough for settlement. Fields extend as far as they can into v-shaped valleys and there is no flat shore.

The hills to the north loom over the lake. At their western edge are Grotte di Castro and Gradoli.

Geology

Lake Bolsena is at the center of the Vulsinii (or Vulsino) Volcanic District of the Roman Comagmatic Region. The lake formed when a circular area collapsed after the depletion of the underlying magmatic chamber that fed the whole volcanic district. Although it is generally known as a volcanic lake, like its southern neighbor Lake Bracciano it is not a crater lake nor does it occupy a caldera. The major calderas of the area are found close to the lake's rim (Latera to the west and Montefiascone to the south east).

Islands of the lake

Bisentina

On the island are groves of evergreen oaks, Italian gardens, and various monuments: the church of Saint James and Saint Christopher with its cupola built by the architect Jacopo Barozzi da Vignola; the Franciscan convent; the Rocchina, a small temple dedicated to Saint Catherine. The latter was constructed in an octagonal floorplan by Antonio da Sangallo, over an Etruscan columbarium previously erected on a rocky outcrop on the lake. Another monument, the chapel of the Crucifix, contains frescos of the fifth century.

The Etruscans and the Romans left few traces of their stay on the island.  In the 9th century it provided refuge from the incursions of the Saracens.

About 1250, it became the property of the lord of Bisenzio, who abandoned it and burned it following disagreements with the inhabitants of the island. In 1261, Urban IV reconquered it. The island was destroyed again in 1333 by Louis IV of Bavaria, accused of heresy and excommunicated by the pope. The property of the Farnese family from 1400 onwards, it had a period of prosperity and was visited by many popes. In 1635, it was governed by Odoardo Farnese, duke of Castro, who entered into conflict with the Church, resulting in the total destruction of Castro. The two islands returned to the Church's control but were soon ceded again.  The princess Beatrice Spada Potenziani, wife of the duke Fieschi Ravaschieri, owned it until 2017. Where it was sold to a foundation.

Martana

Located opposite the town of Marta, the island of Martana is reputed to have once guarded the relics of Saint Christine to keep them from falling into the hands of the barbarians.  Later, it is said that, during the dominion of the Goths, their queen Amalasuntha was assassinated there.

The island is currently private property and no visitors are allowed.

Marta outlet
The Marta is an emissary of Lake Bolsena to the east of the community of  Marta, emptying into the Tyrrhenian Sea. After passing through Marta, Tuscania and Tarquinia, it reaches the sea near Lido di Tarquinia. Salt pans have been constructed between its mouth and that of the Mignone river.

Comuni bordering the lake
The following comuni are situated on the shore of Lake Bolsena:

 Bolsena
 Montefiascone
 Marta
 Capodimonte
 Valentano
 Gradoli
 Grotte di Castro
 San Lorenzo Nuovo

Each has a designated length of beach for summer swimming. Some of these have facilities such as cafés, restaurants and boat rentals.

Other nearby towns are Sorano, Pitigliano, Acquapendente and Orvieto, with Onano to the northwest.

See also
 Lake Mezzano
 Orvieto

Notes

 Google Maps

Bibliography

External links

 

Calderas of Italy
Volcanic lakes of Italy
Volcanic crater lakes
Lakes of Lazio
Lake islands of Italy
Pleistocene volcanoes
Dormant volcanoes